Traubenfeld may refer to:
Tovuz, Azərbaycan
Yenikənd, Tovuz, Azərbaycan